The following is a list of ecoregions in Thailand.

Terrestrial ecoregions
Thailand is in the Indomalayan realm. Ecoregions are listed by biome.

Tropical and subtropical moist broadleaf forests
Cardamom Mountains rain forests
Chao Phraya freshwater swamp forests
Chao Phraya lowland moist deciduous forests 
Kayah-Karen montane rain forests
Luang Prabang montane rain forests
Northern Thailand-Laos moist deciduous forests
Northern Indochina subtropical forests
Northern Khorat Plateau moist deciduous forests
Peninsular Malaysian montane rain forests
Peninsular Malaysian rain forests
Tenasserim-South Thailand semi-evergreen rain forests

Tropical and subtropical dry broadleaf forests
Central Indochina dry forests
Southeastern Indochina dry evergreen forests

Mangroves
 Indochina mangroves
 Myanmar Coast mangroves

Freshwater ecoregions
Thailand's freshwater ecoregions include:
 Mekong
 Khorat Plateau
 Lower Lancang
 Chao Phraya
 Mae Khlong
 Lower and middle Salween
 Malay Peninsula eastern slope

Marine ecoregions
Thailand straddles two marine realms. The Andaman Sea coast is in the Western Indo-Pacific, and the Gulf of Thailand coast is in the Central Indo-Pacific. Thailand's two marine ecoregions are:
 Andaman Sea Coral Coast
 Gulf of Thailand

See also 
 Environmental issues in Thailand
 List of trees of northern Thailand

References

 Wikramanayake, Eric; Eric Dinerstein; Colby J. Loucks; et al. (2002). Terrestrial Ecoregions of the Indo-Pacific: a Conservation Assessment. Washington, DC: Island Press

Thailand
Ecoregions